Shooting Love. 200X is a compilation of Shooting Love. 2007 (itself, an arcade compilation including Exzeal and Shmups Skill Test), Trizeal Remix, and Minus Zero. Shooting Love. 200X was released in North America and Europe (limited to ESRB and PEGI countries) via Xbox Games on Demand on April 21, 2015.

Features
Additions made to Shooting Love, 2007 include:
Score attack mode for each stage, replay saves and playback, reconfigurable difficulty (5 levels) expanded and controller on Exzeal
4-player versus mode in Shmups Skill Test, hidden challenge mode for 11 stages.
Replay saves and playback on Trizeal Remix
Online leaderboards with regular and weekly ranking categories for each game
Advanced screen adjustments, and audio adjustments.

Games

Exzeal

Exzeal follows the similar formula to Trizeal in which players progress through the stages and destroy the bosses respectively. However, the weapon power-up system from Trizeal was removed, replaced by the special fixed-weapon system, with a standard attack and a charged attack that can destroy single large enemies once. The player can choose from one of the four weapon sets during the start, with one mimicking the attack pattern of XII Stag.

The game was later rereleased as a standalone game on Steam in 2016.

Shmups Skill Test
Shmups Skill Test modes include: 1-player test, favourite game practice, 2-player versus modes, and 4-player versus.

1-player test includes 10 sets of stages for total of 20 stages. At the end of the test, player's result is judged by 6 categories, with final evaluations of shop average score, player's final test score, player's gamer age. 2-player versus includes 3 stage types.

Favourite game practice allows player to choose 5 practice stages from 16 available stages within 1 credit, with hidden score attack and score attack mix modes. After completing hidden score attack or score attack mix mode, a password is shown to allow player to register the game result through the game's Internet ranking site.

4-player versus modes (from Shooting Love. 200X) is a 4-player variant of the promotion game title Shooting Love. 8, and adds a test category.

Minus Zero
Minus Zero is an endless shooter with abstract characters. Similar to the other games featured in this compilation, it includes replay saves and playback, and online leaderboards.

Trizeal Remix

Release

A limited edition of Shooting Love, 200X included a superplay called Insanity Nice DVD2!. with expert replays for the Shooting Love. 2007 edition of Exzeal by UNIT-1 by TSP, UNIT-2 by Zen Nippon Aloë wo aiteru kai, UNIT-3 by CYR-Setaro~, UNIT-4 by UMC(hinakko), and the arcade edition of Shmups Skill Test by LYH, Kuusoukagakurensharyokusokutei game Sya Watch by S*Sama; Exzeal OUT TAKE, Shooting Love. Koushien highlight footage.

An extra DVD called Shachou Love. 200X was a pre-order bonus which included footage of Toshiaki Fujino and Triangle Service staff during a Shooting Love. Koushien event.

Reception

Bordersdown awarded the Xbox 360 version of Shooting Love, 200X a score of 4/10.
Video Chums gave the compilation a 7/10 praising it for its "decent collection of games and modes", particularly that "Trizeal Remix and Exzeal feature great classic shoot 'em up gameplay", but criticized the "overall bland presentation".

References

External links

2007
Official website
DCS information on Exzeal

200X
 
INH site

2009 video games
Arcade video games
Scrolling shooters
Video game compilations
Video games developed in Japan
Xbox 360 games
Multiplayer and single-player video games